Tobey is a surname, and may refer to:
Alton Tobey (1914–2005), American artist
Charles W. Tobey (1880–1953), American politician from New Hampshire; U.S. Senator 1939–53
David Tobey (1898–1988), American professional basketball referee
Edward Silas Tobey (1813–1891), American businessman, Postmaster of Boston, president of the American Missionary Association
Franklin W. Tobey (1844–1878), New York politician
John Williams Tobey, American politician
Kenneth Tobey (1917–2002), American stage, film, and television actor
Mark Tobey (1890–1976), American abstract expressionist painter
Mike Tobey (b. 1994), American–born naturalized Slovenian professional basketball player
Paul Tobey (b. 1962), Canadian jazz pianist and composer
Ray Tobey (b. 1965), American computer and video game programmer
Tobey Maguire (b. 1975), American actor and film producer
William H. Tobey (1799–1878), New York politician

See also
Toby (surname)